The 21st Light Dragoons was a cavalry regiment of the British Army.

It was raised on 5 April 1760, as the 21st Light Dragoons (Royal Foresters) by John, Marquis of Granby, and Lord Robert Manners-Sutton.  This first regiment was however disbanded at Nottingham on 3 March 1763.

It was raised again in 1779 by Major-General John Douglas and disbanded in Canterbury in 1783.

The regiment was raised a third time in 1794 in the north of England when it was also known as the Yorkshire Light Dragoons, served in Ireland during the Napoleonic Wars and was disbanded in Chatham in 1819. Regimental colonels were Colonel Thomas Richard Beaumont (1794–1802) and General Sir Banastre Tarleton, Bt., (1802–?1818)

In India another mounted 21st regiment was raised in 1862, by renaming the 3rd Bengal European Cavalry, which eventually became the 21st Lancers, but they have no affiliation to the 21st Light Dragoons.

References 

1760 establishments
Regiments of the British Army